Cronulla is a suburb of Sydney, in the state of New South Wales, Australia. Boasting numerous surf beaches and swimming spots, the suburb attracts both tourists and Greater Sydney residents. Cronulla is located 26 kilometres south of the Sydney central business district, in the local government area of the Sutherland Shire.

Cronulla is located on a peninsula framed by Botany Bay to the north, Bate Bay to the east, Port Hacking to the south, and Gunnamatta Bay to the west. The neighbouring suburb of Woolooware lies to the west of Cronulla, and Burraneer lies to the southwest. The Kurnell peninsula, the site of the first landfall on the eastern coastline made by Captain James Cook in 1770, is reached by driving northeast out of Cronulla on Captain Cook Drive.

History

Cronulla is derived from the Aboriginal word , meaning ‘'place of the small pink seashell'’ in the dialect of the area's Indigenous inhabitants, the Gweagal, who were a clan of the Tharawal (or Dharawal) tribe. They inhabited the southern geographic areas of Sydney. The beaches were named by Surveyor Robert Dixon who surveyed here in 1827-28 and, by 1840, the main beach was still known as Karranulla. In July 1852 the schooner Venus was wrecked on the beach, which was referred to in newspaper reports as Cooranulla.

Matthew Flinders and George Bass explored and mapped the coastline and Port Hacking estuary in 1796 and the southernmost point of Cronulla is named Bass and Flinders Point in their honour. Thomas Holt (1811–88) owned most of the land that stretched from Sutherland to Cronulla in the 1860s. Holt built Sutherland House on the foreshore of Gwawley Bay in 1818, on the eastern side of Sylvania. In 1888 master mariner Captain Joseph Henry Rounce Spingall became the pioneering resident of Cronulla when, with his family, he constructed the two-storey 'Oriental Guest House' on land above where today's North Cronulla Hotel sits. The Depression of 1890 and a lack of reliable transport access from Sutherland saw "The Captain's" pub sold. The Cronulla area was subdivided in 1895 and land was offered for sale at 10 pounds per acre. In 1899, the government named the area , which means sandy hills. On 26 February 1908, it was officially changed to Cronulla and Gunnamatta was used for the name of the bay, on the western side.

After the Illawarra railway line was built to Sutherland in 1885, the area became popular for picnics and swimming. Steam trams operated between Cronulla and Sutherland from 1911. Many regulars rented beach houses at Cronulla every year for school holidays. The Oriental Hotel was built by Captain Spingall in 1888, on the present site of apartments behind the North Cronulla Hotel. The Cecil Hotel was located on the foreshore of South Cronulla and the Ritz Café was popular with holiday-makers. The Cecil Apartments were built on the former site of this hotel. The steam trams were replaced by the Cronulla branch of the Illawarra railway line when it opened in 1939.

The post office opened in January 1891, known as Cronulla Beach, but closed in 1893. It reopened in 1907 and the name was officially changed to Cronulla in 1929. 
The Cronulla School of Arts was established in 1904. The original wooden building was demolished and replaced by the current School of Arts building in November 1912 and is now one of the oldest buildings in Cronulla.

The first public school opened in 1910. In 1955, Cronulla Library opened. From the 1950s, many of the guest houses began being replaced by high rise flats. Even though it developed as a residential area, Cronulla remained popular with beachgoers and tourists. Several hotels, motels and serviced apartments operate today. The Cronulla Bicentennial Plaza opened in February 1989.

In 2005 the beachfront at Cronulla was the scene of widely publicised mob disturbances and violent confrontations. These incidents continued over a number of days and also spread to other areas in Sydney.

Heritage listings 
Cronulla has a number of heritage-listed sites, including:
 Captain Cook Drive: Cronulla sand dunes
Cronulla School of Arts 1912: 
 Cronulla railway: Cronulla railway station
41 Cronulla Street: Cronulla Post Office
 202 Nicholson Parade: Cronulla Fisheries Centre

Beaches

Cronulla is a popular tourist attraction and attracts many beachgoers from all over Sydney. Cronulla Beach features a long stretch of sand that runs from Boat Harbour to North Cronulla, followed by rock pools and another sandy beach at South Cronulla. The beaches of Cronulla from north to south are: Boat Harbour, Greenhills Beach, Wanda Beach, Elouera Beach, North Cronulla Beach, Cronulla Beach, Blackwoods Beach, Shelly Beach and Oak Park. Local names also apply to various parts of the beach, such as The Alley, between Cronulla Beach and North Cronulla, The Wall, between North Cronulla and Elouera, Midway, between Elouera and Wanda,Sandshoes, near the mouth of the Port Hacking estuary, Voodoo Reef and The Point. The beaches are popular recreational areas for swimming, surfing, bodyboarding, bodysurfing and other water sports.

Shark Island, just off Cronulla Beach, is a famous surfing and bodyboarding spot, and the site of the annual Shark Island Challenge bodyboarding contest. Gunnamatta Bay provides protected swimming at the baths off Gunnamatta Park. Port Hacking is a popular location for such water sports as waterskiing and wakeboarding.

Parks

 Bass & Flinders Point is the southernmost part of Cronulla and features a monument to explorers George Bass and Matthew Flinders, who explored the Port Hacking estuary.
 Darook Park, Gunnamatta Park and Tonkin Park are all located on Gunnamatta Bay.

 Cronulla Park is located behind the beach at South Cronulla.
 Dunningham Park sits behind the beach at North Cronulla, shaded by large Norfolk Island pines. It features a children's playground, picnic tables and a kiosk.
 Monro Park, featuring the Cronulla War Memorial, is located opposite Cronulla railway station.
 Don Lucas Reserve is located beside the car park at Wanda Beach, popular for sport and recreational activities such as flying kites.
 Shelly Park sits behind Shelley Beach.
 Oak Park
 Hungry Point Reserve at the end of Nicholson Parade.

Commercial area

The main shopping strip runs along Cronulla Street, which has been partly converted into a pedestrian mall known as Cronulla Plaza. It also extends along the Kingsway, Gerrale Street and other surrounding streets. Cronulla has developed a café culture, with some cafés and restaurants located along the North Cronulla foreshore and Cronulla Plaza. The suburb boasts a Rydges high-rise hotel, although tourists can choose from a variety of hotels, motels and serviced apartments. Cronulla has many restaurants, nightclubs, pubs and bars, as well as a brand-new Hoyts cinema that opened late-2020.

Transport

Trains terminate at Cronulla railway station on the Cronulla branch of the Illawarra line, on the Sydney Trains network. Cronulla Tunnel Gallery is just north of the station, linking Cronulla Street to Tonkin Street.

Cronulla and National Park Ferry Cruises runs passenger services around Port Hacking and a regular route between Cronulla and Bundeena, on the edge of the Royal National Park. The Cronulla Ferry wharf sits on Gunnamatta Bay, beside Tonkin Park.

Transdev NSW operates several bus routes that stop at Cronulla Railway Station. For full details of all bus services see Cronulla Station.

Sport and recreation

 The local National Rugby League football club is the Cronulla-Sutherland Sharks. The Cronulla-Sutherland League's Club and home ground, Endeavour Field, are located on Captain Cook Drive at Woolooware.
 Cronulla-Sutherland Junior Baseball Little League represented Australia in the 2015 Little League World Series where they had a record of one win and two losses.
 Surf lifesaving clubs are located along the beach at Wanda, Elouera, North Cronulla and South Cronulla.
 Many soccer clubs are located in the Cronulla district, the most prominent being Cronulla Seagulls FC and the Cronulla RSL clubs.
 Surfing plays a major role in Cronulla. Famous professional surfer and 1999 world champion Mark Occhilupo ('Occy') grew up surfing in Cronulla. Many surfboard shapers hand craft their surfboards in Cronulla and the Sutherland Shire and Cronulla Beach holds the Australian Boardriders Battle on Australia Day.
The annual Shark Island Challenge bodyboarding contest and the annual Shark Island Swim Challenge are held at Cronulla Beach.
 The Cronulla International Cycling Grand Prix has been held in Cronulla since 2006. In 2009 it was also the Australian National Criterium Championships.
 The Bate Bay Body Bashers are a Bodysurfing club based in Cronulla. They compete in team bodysurfing competitions against other Australian clubs including the East Sydney Bodysurfers and the Northern Beaches Wompers. They were Australian Champions in 2017.
 The Cronulla Polar Bears Winter Swimming Club compete against Bondi Icebergs Winter Swimming Club, South Maroubra Dolphins Winter Swimming Club, Clovelly Eskimos Winter Swimming Club, Maroubra Seals Winter Swimming Club, Coolangatta Surf Life Saving Club, Coogee Penguins Winter Swimming Club, Bronte Splashers, Wollongong Whales and Cottesloe Crabs in the Winter Swimming Association of Australia Championships
 The Sutherland Shire is also home to a number of Rugby Union Clubs led by Southern Districts Rebels, who participate in the Shute Shield competition.  It also has a number of junior teams competing in Sydney Juniors Union and many senior clubs who play in the NSW Suburban Rugby Union competition.

Events
 Cronulla Spring Festival is held every year on the second weekend of September. It includes free entertainment, food and many variety stalls.
 Opera on the Beach is an event commonly held at Cronulla as part of the nation's Australia Day celebrations.

Popular culture
Puberty Blues is a book and movie about the surfing culture in the Sutherland Shire.
 The Australia's Next Top Model (Cycle 4) house was situated on Gunnamatta Bay.
 The Shire is a reality TV show with Cronulla as its main setting; its filming commenced in early 2012.

Demographics
According to the 2016 census, there were 18,070 people in Cronulla.
 Aboriginal and Torres Strait Islander people made up 1.0% of the population.
 The most common ancestries were English 28.5%, Australian 24.5%, Irish 10.9%, Scottish 7.4% and Italian 3.0% 
 75.1% of people were born in Australia. The most common countries of birth were England 3.6%, New Zealand 1.8%, Philippines 0.6% and Germany 0.6%.  
 82.7% of people only spoke English at home. Other languages spoken at home included Greek 0.9%, Spanish 0.9%, Portuguese 0.7%, Italian 0.7% and German 0.6%. 
 The most common responses for religion were Catholic 27.5%, No Religion 27.4% and Anglican 18.2%.
 The median weekly household income was $1,794, higher than the national median of $1,438.
 Real estate costs were correspondingly high; the median mortgage repayments were $2,167 compared to the national median of $1,755.
 Of occupied private dwellings in Cronulla, 72.7% were flat or apartments, 20.5% were separate houses and 5.7% were semi-detached.

Notable residents

 Scott Morrison, 30th Prime Minister of Australia
 Luke Baines, actor, singer and model
 Lara Bingle, model, former partner of cricketer Michael Clarke
 Brendan Cowell, actor, appeared on Love My Way and Game of Thrones
 Aileen Griffiths OAM, community worker and organiser
 Tom Jay Williams, former lead singer of Lynk
 Daniel MacPherson, Australian actor, TV presenter, notable for being in City Homicide and Dancing with the Stars
 Chris McCormack, ironman, triathlete
 Craig Alexander, ironman, triathlete
 Toni Pearen, TV presenter, actress
 Ben McNeill, film producer
 Myles Pollard, actor, appeared on McLeod's Daughters
 Jason Stevens, former Cronulla-Sutherland Sharks player
 Sharni Vinson, actress, appeared on Home and Away
 Damian Keogh, former Australian basketball captain and CEO of Hoyts cinema group and Val Morgan
 Steve Waugh, former Australian Cricket Captain

Schools
Cronulla is home to a number of primary and secondary schools: 
Cronulla High School
De La Salle College
Our Lady of Mercy College
Cronulla Public School
South Cronulla Public School
St Francis De Sales
Burraneer Bay Public School
St Aloysius Catholic Primary School

Churches
There are several churches in the Cronulla area: 
St Andrews Anglican Church
St Aloysius Catholic Church
Cronulla Baptist Church
Cronulla Uniting Church
Presbyterian War Memorial Church
C3 Church Cronulla
Establish Church

See also
 2005 Cronulla riots
 Arts Theatre Cronulla
 Cronulla railway station
 Cronulla sand dunes
 Electoral district of Cronulla, a seat in the New South Wales Legislative Assembly

References

External links 

 Cronulla - Sydney.com

 
Suburbs of Sydney
Botany Bay
Beaches of New South Wales